byebyesea (Annyeongbada) (안녕바다), meaning 'goodbye sea', is a famous Korean pop band. They debuted in 2009 under Fluxus Music.

History
Band byebyesea, Annyeongbada first formed as an indie band in 2006 as "I Cross the Sea With You" (난그대와바다를가르네), active in the Hongdae area of Seoul.  They renamed the group byebyesea (Annyeongbada) in May 2007, and in March 2008 they signed with Fluxus Music. In 2009, before their official debut in December, the group made two cameos on the TV-dramas I Am Legend and Playful Kiss.  They have performed at many rock music festivals throughout Korea like Green Plugged Festival, Beautiful Mint Life, and Pentaport Rock Festival.

Star Shower (별빛이 내린다) was a song that really pulled Annyeongbada into the spotlight. Being performed and featured in many TV programs, the song is still used today on variety shows and CFs for its unique melody that gives the feeling of being star struck.

Namu (Tree Kim) has been also working as music director since 2021. One of his film as a music director, "Song of the Same Night" won many awards in numerous world film festivals. And currently working in other films as music director as well.

Song of the Same Night IMDB page

Members

Current members
 Namu (Tree Kim) (나무) - vocals and guitar
 Myung Je Woo (우명제) - bass
 Sunjae Woo (우선제) - guitar

Current Session members
 Sangjin Kwon (권상진) - keyboard
 Sungjae, Kim (김성재) - drums

Past members
 Lee Joon-hyuk (이준혁) - drums
 Dae-hyun (대현) - keyboard

Discography

Studio albums

Mini-Albums/EP
 [2009.12.07] Boy's Universe
 [2017.03.23] It's okay it's spring
 [2017.09.26] Will it rain today
 [2017.11.27] Snow Waltz
 [2018.04.17] 701 A-side
 [2018.11.02] 701 B-side
 [2020.12.07] Hello Merry Christmas
 [2021.05.11] Your 1g
 [2021.08.04] She knows the future
 [2022.02.15] Rainbow Bridge

Movies
 Loveholic (2010) / Cameo
 Song of the Same Night (2021) / Cameo (self) / Music Director (나무 Namu: Tree Kim)
 Insomnia (2022) / Music Director (나무 Namu: Tree Kim)
 Song of the Same Night Unplugged (2022) / Music Director (나무 Namu: Tree Kim)
 Starshower (2023 - pre-production)

Television
 [2010.08.02 - 2010.09.21] I Am Legend - Soo-in's boyband trainees
 [2010.09.01 - 2010.10.21] Playful Kiss - Bong Joon Gu's followers
 [2010.02.24] MBC Music Travel LaLaLa
 [2011.02.12] MBC Show! Music Core
 [2011.02.18] KBS You Hee-yeol's Sketchbook
 [2013.08.10] KBS You Hee-yeol's Sketchbook
 [2015-2017] KBS TV show ‘All That Music’
 [2016.03.04] KBS You Hee-yeol's Sketchbook
 [2017] MBC TV show ‘nanjang’

References

External links
 Official Facebook

K-pop music groups
Musical groups established in 2006